Bhabhar may refer to:
Bhabar, the region south of the Lower Himalayas and the Sivalik Hills in India
Bhabhar, a town in Banaskantha district of Gujarat, India